Verin Bazmaberd is a village in the Talin Municipality of the Aragatsotn Province of Armenia.

References 
 
 Report of the results of the 2001 Armenian Census

Populated places in Aragatsotn Province